Earth pressure balance, or EPB, is a mechanised tunneling method in which the excavated material is used to support the tunnel face whilst it is being plasticised using foams/slurry & other additives to make it transportable and impermeable. The spoil is admitted into the tunnel boring machine (TBM) via a screw conveyor (cochlea) arrangement which allows the pressure at the face of the TBM to remain balanced without the use of slurry.

This has allowed soft, wet, or unstable ground to be tunneled with a speed and safety not previously possible.

The Channel Tunnel, the Thames Water Ring Main, sections of the London Underground, and most new metro tunnels completed in the last 20 years worldwide were excavated using this method.

EPB has historically "competed" with the slurry balance method of mechanised tunneling where the slurry is used to stabilise the tunnel face and transport spoil to the surface.

See also
 Tunnel boring machine
 Tunnels
 Boring

Tunnels